Kalanchoe garambiensis is a plant species in the succulent genus Kalanchoe, and the family Crassulaceae. It is endemic to Taiwan.

Distribution 
The plant is found on limestone near coast of Taiwan Kaohsiung and Hengchun Peninsula.

Plant structure 
Kalanchoe garambiensis is a perennial succulent herbaceous plant. No more than 10 centimeters in height.

References 

 

garambiensis